Triplostegia is a genus of flowering plants belonging to the family Caprifoliaceae.

Its native range is Himalaya to Taiwan, Sulawesi, New Guinea.

Species:
 Triplostegia glandulifera Wall. ex DC.

References

Caprifoliaceae
Caprifoliaceae genera